Statements is an album by jazz vibraphonist Milt Jackson, released in 1962 on Impulse! Records.

The CD reissue adds tracks 9-13 featuring a composition originally on an Impulse sampler as well as quintet recordings from 1964 also released on   Jazz 'n' Samba

Track listing
"Statements" (Milt Jackson) – 5:28
"Slowly" (Kermit Goell, David Raksin) – 3:02
"Thrill from the Blues" (Jackson) – 5:42
"Put Off" (Jackson) – 5:34
"Sonnymoon for Two" (Sonny Rollins) – 5:57
"Bad and the Beautiful" (Raksin) – 3:07
"Paris Blues" (Duke Ellington) – 2:54
"Beautiful Romance" (Jackson) – 2:26
"Blues for Juanita" (Jackson) – 5:38
"I Got It Bad (and That Ain't Good)" (Ellington, Paul Francis Webster) – 2:38
"Big George" (Jackson) – 4:43
"Gingerbread Boy" (Jimmy Heath) – 3:41
"Anything I Do" (Chester Conn, George Douglas) – 2:59

Personnel
Milt Jackson – vibraphone
Jimmy Heath – tenor saxophone
Tommy Flanagan – piano
Hank Jones – piano
Paul Chambers – bass
Connie Kay – drums

Production
Pete Turner - photography

References 

Milt Jackson albums
1962 albums
Impulse! Records albums
Albums produced by Bob Thiele
Albums produced by Michael Cuscuna
Albums recorded at Van Gelder Studio